The Craighill Channel Upper Range Front Light is one of a pair of range lights that marks the second section of the shipping channel into Baltimore harbor.

History
Work on the upper range lights commenced in 1885 and was completed in time to allow activation in January 1886. An initial plan to reuse the west North Point Range Light was discarded in favor of a tiny brick structure constructed on the foundation of the old light. The keeper's house was built on the shore, and a long wooden bridge allowed access to the light itself. Initially a locomotive headlight was installed to show a fixed white light.

Three years after improvements to the keeper's house were made in 1890, the bridge to the light was destroyed by a storm. Rather than rebuild it, the headlight was moved to the exterior of the light, and the keeper took up residence in the light itself. The light was electrified and automated in 1929. Although there are some claims that the light was rebuilt in 1938, this is believed to be a misunderstanding based on discrepancies in the reported height of the light over the years.

Notes

References
 
 Craighill Range Lighthouses, from the Chesapeake Chapter of the United States Lighthouse Society
 Craighill Channel Upper Front Lighthouse at lighthousefriends.org

External links
 http://www.craighillrange.org
 
 Chesapeake Bay Lighthouse Project - Craighill Channel Range Lights
 , at Maryland Historical Trust

Lighthouses completed in 1886
Lighthouses on the National Register of Historic Places in Maryland
Lighthouses in Baltimore County, Maryland
National Register of Historic Places in Baltimore County, Maryland